Five Oaks is a large hamlet in the Horsham District of West Sussex, England. It lies about 1.7 miles (2.8 km) north of Billingshurst on the Roman road of Stane Street (now the A29) at the junction with the Western end of the A264.

References

External links

Horsham District
Villages in West Sussex